The Pakistan national cricket team toured South Africa for three Tests, five ODIs and one T20 from 6 January to 14 February 2007.

South Africa won the Test series 2–1.

South Africa also won the T20.

South Africa won the 5-match ODI series 3–1 with one game ending with no result.

Tour match

Test series

Squads

1st Test

Pakistan won the toss and elected to bat first.
Day 1: Pakistan 242/5. 
Day 2: Pakistan 313, South Africa 254/4. 
Day 3: Pakistan 313 & 103/2, South Africa 417.
Day 4: Pakistan 313 & 302, South Africa 417 & 69/2.

2nd Test
South Africa won the toss and chose to bat first.
Day 1: South Africa 124, Pakistan 135/6.
Day 2: South Africa 124 & 115/3, Pakistan 265. Makhaya Ntini becomes the 22nd bowler, and third South African, to reach 300 Test wickets.
Day 3: South Africa 124 & 331, Pakistan 265 & 8/0.

3rd Test
South Africa won the toss and chose to field first.
Day 1: Pakistan 157, South Africa 131/5. 
Day 2: Pakistan 157 & 186, South Africa 183 & 36/2.

T20I series

Only T20I

ODI series

Squads

1st ODI

2nd ODI

3rd ODI

4th ODI

5th ODI

References

2007 in South African cricket
International cricket competitions in 2006–07
2006-07
2006–07 South African cricket season
2007 in Pakistani cricket